The Hong Kong one hundred and fifty dollar note is a commemorative banknote issued by the Standard Chartered Bank (Hong Kong) on 1 October 2009 and HSBC on 2015 to commemorate on the 150th Anniversary of the Standard Chartered Hong Kong branch and HSBC respectively. It is the world's first 150 base unit denomination banknote. Approximately 1 million notes were issued by Standard Charter and 2 million by HSBC. Owing to its rarity and expected higher re-sale value, the notes are unlikely to enter circulation, though they are still considered legal tender.

See also

Banknotes of the Hong Kong dollar

References

Banknotes of Hong Kong
Commemorative banknotes